Trapanese is an Italian surname, meaning literally "Trapanese", "from the city of Trapani or "from the province of Trapani" and may refer to:

 Joseph Trapanese (born 1984), American composer
 Rita Trapanese (1951–2000), Italian figure skater

Italian toponymic surnames